(b. 1565?) was a Japanese merchant from the port of Sakai, who traded shimamono pottery in Japan from Luzon in the Philippines and later emigrated to Cambodia in the final years of the 16th century.

Biography 
Originally known as Naya Sukezaemon (納屋助左衛門), he was the son of Sakai merchant Naya Saisuke. He changed his name in 1593 or 1594 after returning from a trip to Luzon in the Philippines. He became successful and wealthy in the South Seas trade, particularly from selling shimamono pottery from Luzon to Toyotomi Hideyoshi and other powerful lords. It is said that even the great tea master Sen no Rikyū prized some of the tea wares brought back from Southeast Asia by Sukezaemon. Sukezaemon built himself a lavish Western-style house in Sakai and lived a rather luxurious lifestyle for several years before attracting the attention and the ire of Hideyoshi. In 1598, the warlord accused the merchant on bogus charges, and confiscated all his possessions; Sukezaemon entrusted his home to his family's temple, the Daian-ji, and fled Japan for Cambodia.

Very little is known about Sukezaemon from original sources, but like many merchant sailors and maritime adventurers of the period, a number of legends have arisen about him. He has been conflated with the pirate Tai Fusa who attacked Manila some years earlier and was defeated; according to some tales, when Sukezaemon left Japan he took one hundred men with him and led a raid or assault on Manila, but was ultimately forced to flee to Cambodia. Other sources omit the piracy and violence and indicate simply that he remained in Manila until, around 1607, the Spanish began to interfere in the Philippines, and Sukezaemon fled to Cambodia, where he earned the trust of the local authorities and began to trade once more.

He is buried at the Daian-ji in Sakai, and bronze statues of him can be seen in that city, and in Manila as well.

In popular culture 
Was portrayed by Toshiro Mifune in the 1963 film The Great Bandit (aka The Lost World of Sinbad). He also appeared in a novel by Saburō Shiroyama, and in the 1978 Taiga drama Ōgon no Hibi as well as the 2016 Taiga drama Sanada Maru

References

 Miyamoto, Kazuo. Vikings of the Far East. New York: Vantage Press, 1975. pp88–89.

1560s births
Japanese emigrants to Cambodia
Year of death unknown
16th-century Japanese businesspeople
People from Sakai, Osaka